Sushi Typhoon is a Japanese genre film production company founded in 2010 and currently owned by media conglomerate Nikkatsu Corporation, Japan's oldest existing film studio.

History

Sushi Typhoon was founded in 2010 as a subsidiary of Nikkatsu, with the intent to create low-budget horror, science fiction, and fantasy films aimed at an international audience. Zeiram producer Yoshinori Chiba is credited as Sushi Typhoon's creator  and oversees the company's full production schedule. Since its inception, the company has produced seven feature films. The label was put on indefinite hiatus in early 2012, and has produced no new films since.

Staff

The core Sushi Typhoon staff consists of producer Chiba; directors Takashi Miike (noted in the company's production trailer as its "head chef"), Yoshihiro Nishimura, Sion Sono, Noboru Iguchi, Tak Sakaguchi, Yudai Yamaguchi, and Seiji Chiba; action director Yuji Shimomura; visual effects supervisor Tsuyoshi Kazuno; and art director Yoshiki Takahashi. Former New York Asian Film Festival co-director Marc Walkow headed Sushi Typhoon's American division and international festival bookings.

Films

As of 2011, Sushi Typhoon has produced the following feature films:

 Alien vs Ninja (2010)
 Mutant Girls Squad (2010)
 Cold Fish (2011)
 Deadball (2011)
 Helldriver (2011)
 Karate-Robo Zaborgar (2011)
 Yakuza Weapon (2011)

References

Japanese film studios
Japanese companies established in 2010
Mass media companies established in 2010